The 2013–14 Suomi-sarja season was the 15th season of the Suomi-sarja, the third level of ice hockey in Finland. 14 teams participated in the league, and KeuPa HT won the championship. They were promoted to the Mestis league for 2014–15 and Raahe-Kiekko were relegated to II-divisioona. They were replaced by KaKiPo and IPK.

Regular season

Playoffs

2013-14 Mestis qualification

Play-out

1st round
Nokian PYRY - Raahe-Kiekko 2:0 (6:2, 13:1)
HC Satakunta - Kokkolan Hermes 2:1 (4:2, 3:4 OT, 3:2)
Waasa Red Ducks - Hydraulic Oilers 2:0 (6:4, 1:0)

2nd round

3rd round

Group 1

Group 2

References
 EliteProspects.com

2013–14 in Finnish ice hockey